Brett Bennett (born 10 February 1947) is a New Zealand sailor. He competed in the 470 event at the 1976 Summer Olympics.

References

External links
 

1947 births
Living people
New Zealand male sailors (sport)
Olympic sailors of New Zealand
Sailors at the 1976 Summer Olympics – 470
Sportspeople from Gisborne, New Zealand